Toonami is a television channel that launched in France on 11 February 2016. It is operated and distributed by Warner Bros. Discovery France, which is a subsidiary of Warner Bros. Discovery International. It is named after the late night television programming block seen on Adult Swim in the United States every Saturday night. From 2016 until 2020, France's Toonami used the logo introduced by the original block in 2004 with branded promos that were also used in Southeast Asia.

During the day, the channel's programs were all subject to censorship. From 9 p.m. to 11 p.m. CET, the channel was branded as Toonami Unlimited, with its TV series and All Elite Wrestling professional wrestling (which is not produced by Warner Bros. Discovery, but airs on Warner Bros. Discovery channels in the United States) subject to little to no censorship. In September 2020, Toonami was rebranded and became a young adult channel. Since 24 July 2019, an Adult Swim block is broadcast nightly between 11 p.m. and 2 a.m. CET.

History 
On 3 February, it was confirmed by Toonami Squad in an email with Turner that Toonami would be launching in France on 11 February 2016. For the first four years, the channel's programming was geared toward the young children and teen demographics.

During evenings, the channel was branded as Toonami Unlimited, airing programs with no censorship. In 2019, an Adult Swim block launched during night-time, followed by adding live-action series and AEW Dynamite to Toonami Unlimited programming.

In September 2020, Toonami underwent a rebranding with a new programming strategy, which targeted the teen and young adult demographics with programs no longer subject to censorship during the day. Now targeting a more mature audience, the channel kept its Adult Swim block. Toonami and Adult Swim are also available in SVOD mainly in co-bundled subscriptions.

On 14 September 2020, Toonami France was added on StarTimes, being available alongside its English-language African counterpart.

On 10 January 2023, Toonami was dropped from Canal+, following the failure of the negotiations for the renewal of Warner channels.

Programming

Adult Swim

References 

French companies established in 2016
French-language television stations
Toonami
Television stations in France
Television channels and stations established in 2016
Turner Broadcasting System France
Warner Bros.
Adult Swim